Weyersheim is a commune in the Bas-Rhin department in Grand Est in north-eastern France.

Population

Twin towns
Weyersheim is twinned with:

  Rot am See, Germany, since 2000

See also
 Communes of the Bas-Rhin department

References

Communes of Bas-Rhin